Ovi (meaning Door in English) is a multilingual non-profit daily publication that carries articles about ideas and opinion. It is based in Helsinki.

History and profile
Launched in December 2004 by two immigrants to Finland, Asa Butcher and Thanos Kalamidas, Ovi carries contributions to society, politics and culture in a number of different languages.

In 2006 Ovi was chosen as a Uranus.fi Success Story

Since 4 September 2006 the site has had daily updates and continues to cover various global issues, including discrimination, inequality, poverty, human rights and children's rights.

In January 2007, Ovi came second in Newropeans Magazine's Grands Prix 2006 awards. They were nominated as one of the three finalists in its 'Citizenship - Information' section. The awards recognise people active in the democratisation of the EU. A registered jury of around 1,000 people voted online, awarding Ovi 29% of the vote.

See also
 List of Finnish magazines

References

External links
 Ovi magazine website

2004 establishments in Finland
Cultural magazines
Magazines established in 2004
Magazines published in Helsinki
Online magazines
Political magazines published in Finland